The surnames Chajes (Ashkenazic Hebrew), Chayes, Hayyot, Hayyut, Hiyyut are from the Hebrew word .

 means animal;  means vitality 

 Abram Chayes (1922-2000), American scholar of international law
 Benno Chajes (1880-1938), German physician and politician
 Rabbi Isaac Hayyut (died 1726), Polish rabbi
 Jennifer Tour Chayes (born 1956), mathematical physicist and managing director of Microsoft Research New England
 Rabbi Menahem Manesh Hayyut (died 1636), Polish rabbi
 Oscar Chajes (1973-1928), Austrian-American chess player
 Sarah Chayes (born 1962), American journalist
 Rabbi Zvi Hirsch Chajes (1805-1855), Galician rabbi
 Rabbi Zwi Perez Chajes (1876-1927), Austrian rabbi

See also 
 Chai (symbol)
 Chayyim (Haim) (pl.)
 Chayyey; e.g. Chayei Sarah
 Surnamed people Chaitin, (Galith) Chayyat', Chayat are from Chayyat' / Khayat / Chait, a tailor (cf.Schneider/shreyder)

Hebrew-language names
Jewish surnames